Kiriakoffalia guineae is a moth of the  family Erebidae. It was described by Strand in 1912. It is found in Equatorial Guinea and Gabon.

References

 Natural History Museum Lepidoptera generic names catalog

Spilosomina
Moths described in 1912